Psilocybin therapy is the use of psilocybin (the psychoactive ingredient in psilocybin mushrooms) in treating a range of mental health conditions, such as depression, anxiety, addictions, obsessive compulsive disorder, and psychosis. It is one of several forms of psychedelic therapy under study. Psilocybin was popularized as a psychedelic recreational drug in the 1970s and was classified as a Schedule I drug by the DEA. Research on psilocybin as a medical treatment was restricted until the 1990s because of the sociocultural fear of dependence on this drug. As of 2022, psilocybin is the most commonly researched psychedelic due to its safety and low potential for abuse and dependence. Clinical trials are being conducted at universities and there is evidence confirming the use of psilocybin in the treatment of depression, PTSD and end of life anxiety.

History 

The first historical record of psilocybin use dates back to Mesoamerica. A Codex known as the "Yuta Tnoho" that belonged to the Mixtec culture in the 1500s BCE depicted religious ritual ingestion of psilocybin-containing mushrooms.

Ritualistic consumption of psilocybe mushrooms continues into modern spiritual and medicinal practice. The hallucinations produced by the psilocybin induces a trance-like state that is believed to allow the soul to disconnect from the body, resulting in healing and spiritual enlightenment.

In 1959, Albert Hofmann, a Swiss chemist, was the first person to extract pure psilocybin from the mushroom Psilocybe mexicana. Sandoz, the company that employed Hofmann, then began to sell the active compound to clinicians as an aid in psychedelic psychotherapy.

In August 1960, Timothy Leary conducted a self-experiment using psilocybin mushrooms. After trying pure, extracted psilocybin, he and Dr. Richard Alpert tested whether it could help reduce recidivism rate and constitute an effective psychotherapy aid. In 1963, Leary and Alpert were suspended from their jobs at Harvard University, due to irresponsible and dangerous experimentation with psilocybin mushrooms. Psilocybin research in the United States ended in 1970 when the use and possession of psilocybin mushrooms became illegal.

In 2018–19, the United States Food and Drug Administration (FDA) granted breakthrough therapy designation to facilitate further research for psilocybin in the possible treatment of depressive disorders.

Research
Psilocybin is the main psychoactive compound in the mushroom genus Psilocybe. Psilocybin (O-phosphoryl-4-hydroxy-N,N-dimethyltryptamine) and its active metabolite psilocin (4-hydroxy-N,N-dimethyltryptamine) are part of a group of tryptamine/indolamine hallucinogens that are related to serotonin. In the GI tract psilocybin is converted to psilocin. Psilocyn is a selective agonist of the 5HT receptors, specifically 5-HT1A, 5-HT2A, 5-HT2B, and 5-HT2C. Research has shown the importance of preparing individuals before undergoing psilocybin therapy and controlling the setting in order to maximize the therapeutic effect and minimize risk. This preparation often involves medical and psychological evaluation, as well as 6-8 hours of psychotherapy provided by a licensed clinician. 

As of 2022, there are over 60 clinical trials researching the therapeutic effects of psilocybin by the United States National Institute of Health (NIH). While short-term effects have been acknowledged, the long-term efficacy and safety of psilocybin therapy is yet to be determine due to most trials being ongoing. However, preliminary results indicate that psilocybin therapy is efficacious in treating depression, smoking cessation, alcohol use disorder, and obsessive-compulsive disorder.

Studies investigating the effectiveness in psilocybin therapy in treating major depressive disorder (MDD) have found that psilocybin had comparable efficacy to selective serotonin reuptake inhibitors (SSRIs). Further, meaningful clinical change was observed in the treatment of obsessive-compulsive disorder.

Research has also been conducted on psilocybin therapy for the treatment of migraines and cluster headaches.

Neuroscience and Pharmacology 
Given that most studies on psilocybin therapy are in early phases, little is understood about the highly complicated mechanisms that support the efficacy of psilocybin therapy. Psilocybin is a prodrug for psilocin, meaning that psilocybin is dephosphorylated to psilocin in the body so it can cross the blood-brain barrier. Psilocin primarily bonds to the 5-HT1A and 5-HT1B serotonin receptors. Although to a lesser extent, psilocin also bonds to dopamine-3 receptors, which may aid in treating substance use disorders.

Further, psilocin has some effect on the amygdala and hypothalamus that aids in circadian rhythm regulation.

Safety 
In the United States, psilocybin and other psychedelic drugs have been heavily criminalized since the 1960s, classified as a Schedule I substance under the federal Controlled Substances Act (Schedule I is defined as a substance having substantial potential for abuse, absence of adequate safety evidence, and no currently accepted clinical uses for therapy). Prior to the 1960s, psychedelics were not considered "hard drugs," and were studied extensively for their immense medicinal potential for treating psychiatric disorders; the criminalization of psychedelics via their classification as Schedule I substances is inconsistent with over 70 years of scientific and medical research and was contrary to all available evidence at the time. According to the largest controlled clinical study of psilocybin to date at Kings College London, volunteers who received doses of psilocybin experienced no serious adverse side effects, experiencing some changes in mood and perception but no negative effects on cognitive or emotional functioning.

Legal status 

While the use and possession of psilocybin in the United States is still illegal under federal law, several U.S. cities have decriminalized its use. The following is a list of cities where psilocybin is decriminalized in the U.S.: 
 May 2019: Denver, Colorado  
 June 2019: Oakland, California 
 January 2020: Santa Cruz, California 
 November 2020: Washington, D.C.  
 January 2021: Somerville, Massachusetts 
 February 2021: Cambridge, Massachusetts 
 March 2021: Northampton, Massachusetts  
 October 2021: Seattle, Washington 
In November 2020, the U.S. state of Oregon legalized psilocybin for people age 21 and older, and decriminalized possession or use of psilocybin mushrooms for medical conditions, such as depression, anxiety, or PTSD. Colorado in November of 2022 also decriminalized psychedelic mushrooms for use in state regulated "healing centers".

References 

Psilocybin
Psychedelic drug research